Tayler Andrew Saucedo (born June 18, 1993) is an American professional baseball pitcher for the Seattle Mariners of Major League Baseball (MLB). He was drafted by the Toronto Blue Jays in the 21st round of the 2015 Major League Baseball draft, and made his MLB debut for the team in 2021.

Amateur career
Saucedo was born on June 18, 1993, in Honolulu, Hawaii to mother Tanya and father Andy. He is of Mexican descent and his family ancestry can be traced to Spain and Guatemala. As Saucedo's father was a marine, he moved around a lot as a child including Hawaii, Japan, Seattle, and Texas. While living in Japan, Saucedo was introduced to the sport of baseball. As a child, Saucedo began to pursue the position of pitcher when he would pitch against older children. His father was required to sign a waiver to allow him to play against 12 year olds.

While in middle school, Saucedo was selected for the Little League All Stars and subsequently played varsity baseball at Tahoma High School in Maple Valley, Washington. He was originally cut from the team in Grade 10 and then failed to record a single win in his junior season. Following his junior year, Saucedo cited his lack of confidence as a factor for his poor season. He improved from 0–4 to a 7–1 in his senior campaign as he led the Bears to a South Puget Sound League North Division title. As such, Saucedo was selected for the 2011 Washington State Baseball Coaches Association Class 4A All-State second team and the 2011 South Puget Sound League All-North Division first team.

Collegiate career
Due to his grades, Saucedo began his collegiate career at Tacoma Community College but dropped out after his first year. Prior to leaving, Saucedo was selected as a Top 200 Junior College Prospect and played in the Coastal Plains League for the Martinsville Mustangs during the summer of 2013. After redshirting in 2013, Saucedo enrolled at Tennessee Wesleyan University. In April 2015, Saucedo earned his first Appalachian Athletic Conference Baseball Pitcher of the Week Honour after he walked three and fanned seven batters from Union to recorded a complete-game, one-hit shutout win. Following the win, he had a 4–1 on the season with a 1.53 ERA. He was selected by the Toronto Blue Jays in the 21st round, 632nd overall, of the 2015 Major League Baseball draft.

Professional career

Toronto Blue Jays
Following the draft, Saucedo made his professional debut with the Bluefield Blue Jays of the Rookie Appalachian League. While with the team, he pitched 22.1 innings collecting 1 win, 1 save, a 2.42 ERA, and 18 strikeouts. He also played for the Low-A Vancouver Canadians, posting a 4-2 record and 2.48 ERA in 13 games. In his second Canadians game on August 8, 2015, Saucedo pitched six scoreless innings to lead the team to a 5–1 over the Spokane Indians. By the end of the month, Saucedo had allowed 16 hits in 20 innings and recorded 12 walks. He also struck out 17 batters with various pitching styles including a fastball, a curve, a slider, and a change-up. 

He spent the 2016 season in Single-A with the Lansing Lugnuts, pitching to an 8-11 record and 5.91 ERA with 71 strikeouts in 120.1 innings of work. In 2017, Saucedo split the season between the High-A Dunedin Blue Jays and Lansing, recording a 5-3 record and 4.48 ERA in 33 appearances. In 2018, Saucedo split the year between the Double-A New Hampshire Fisher Cats and Dunedin, logging a 10-9 record and 4.21 ERA in 26 games between the two teams. In 2019, he split the year between the Triple-A Buffalo Bisons and New Hampshire, posting an 8-2 record and 3.61 ERA with 69 strikeouts in 82.1 innings pitched.

Saucedo did not play in a game in 2020 due to the cancellation of the minor league season because of the COVID-19 pandemic. He was assigned to Triple-A Buffalo to begin the 2021 season, and pitched to a 2–1 record and 2.20 ERA in 10 appearances for the team.

On June 12, 2021, Saucedo was selected to the 40-man roster and promoted to the majors for the first time. Saucedo subsequently made his MLB debut on June 17, pitching a scoreless inning of relief against the New York Yankees. In his debut, he also notched his first career strikeout, punching out Yankees outfielder Miguel Andújar. In September, Saucedo was optioned to Buffalo to make room for pitcher Anthony Castro.

Seattle Mariners
On November 9, 2022, Saucedo was claimed off waivers by the New York Mets. Saucedo was designated for assignment by the Mets on January 24, 2023, after the signing of Tommy Pham was made official.

On January 31, 2023, Saucedo was claimed off waivers by the Seattle Mariners.

References

External links

Tennessee Wesleyan Bulldogs bio

1993 births
Living people
Baseball players from Honolulu
Major League Baseball pitchers
Toronto Blue Jays players
Tacoma Titans baseball players
Tennessee Wesleyan Bulldogs baseball players
Vancouver Canadians players
Bluefield Blue Jays players
Lansing Lugnuts players
Dunedin Blue Jays players
Canberra Cavalry players
New Hampshire Fisher Cats players
Buffalo Bisons (minor league) players
American expatriate baseball players in Australia
Florida Complex League Blue Jays players